Tony Armstrong (born 29 September 1989) is an Aboriginal Australian television presenter and former professional Australian rules footballer. Tony played for the Adelaide Football Club, Sydney Swans and Collingwood Football Club in the Australian Football League (AFL).  

He is currently sport presenter of the ABC's morning program News Breakfast. For his work on this show, he won the Graham Kennedy Award for Most Popular New Talent at the 2022 Logies.

AFL 
Originally from Burrumbuttock, New South Wales and of Barrabinya descent, Armstrong was initially interested in rugby league, but turned to Australian rules football, supporting the Sydney Swans. Armstrong was drafted by Adelaide in the 2007 AFL Draft at pick number 58.

Armstrong attended prestigious football school Assumption College, and also played games with TAC Cup sides NSW/ACT Rams and Calder Cannons. After being drafted, he played for SANFL club North Adelaide, and after some fine performances, was rewarded by Adelaide coach Neil Craig with many emergency spots in the lineup. He was named for his AFL debut in round 13, 2009, but was quarantined along with his housemate, teammate and fellow Assumption College graduate Richard Douglas due to a swine influenza scare, and so did not take his place on the field.

Armstrong debuted in the senior side in Round 1, 2010, against Fremantle at Subiaco.

In September 2011, Armstrong walked out on the Adelaide Crows and requested a trade to the Sydney Swans, the club he supported as a child growing up in NSW. On 16 October 2011, Armstrong was granted his wish and was traded to the Swans in exchange for Lewis Johnston.

In April 2012, he made his debut for the Swans; he replaced club captain Adam Goodes, who was suspended for the match. Goodes is one of Armstrong's childhood idols.

At the end of 2013 AFL season, Armstrong was delisted by Sydney Swans and then joined Collingwood as a delisted free agent. He made his debut for Collingwood in round 19 of the 2014 AFL season.

Armstrong was delisted at the conclusion of the 2014 AFL season but was re-drafted by Collingwood in the rookie draft. At the conclusion of the 2015 season, after only playing one senior game, Armstrong was again delisted by Collingwood.

Media 
In March 2020, Armstrong began hosting the show Yokayi Footy, a collaboration between NITV and the AFL. 

In June 2020, Armstrong joined ABC as a producer and presenter of sports news on ABC Radio and Television presenting sport on ABC News, commentating for Grandstand AFL on ABC Sport and hosting the summer series of Offsiders.

In March 2021, ABC announced that Armstrong would fill in for Paul Kennedy on ABC TV's News Breakfast presenting sport from Tuesday to Friday for 3 months whilst Kennedy works on ABC's 7.30. Catherine Murphy presented sport on Monday. In July 2021, Armstrong was appointed as sport presenter on News Breakfast replacing Kennedy.

In November 2021, ABC announced that Armstrong would host A Dog’s World on ABC TV, a three-part series that seeks to understand our ever-evolving relationship with dogs.

In June 2022, Armstrong won the Graham Kennedy Award for Most Popular New Talent at the 2022 Logie Awards for his work on the ABC News Breakfast show.

Armstrong also regularly appears on Network 10's The Project and semi-regularly on Fox Footy.

Personal life
In September 2010, Armstrong was caught by police drink driving at over four times the legal limit. He had his driver's licence suspended for one year and his car was impounded. Additionally, the Adelaide Crows fined him $5,000 and suspended him for four matches.

References

External links

Adelaide Football Club players
Collingwood Football Club players
North Adelaide Football Club players
Sydney Swans players
NSW/ACT Rams players
Calder Cannons players
1989 births
Living people
Indigenous Australian players of Australian rules football
Australia international rules football team players
Logie Award winners
Australian rules footballers from Albury
Australian television presenters